Alfred Ernest Chalk (27 November 1874 – 25 June 1954) was a British Railway clerk and footballer who competed in the 1900 Olympic Games.

He was well known in London football circles at the turn of the century. He played for Ilford, Barking Woodville, and Essex County, and was right-half for Upton Park when they won the gold medal in the 1900 Olympics. According to the limited reports which reached London from Paris, Chalk was one of the Olympic side's outstanding players. He was one of 18 children of a railway station manager and followed in his father's profession by becoming a railway clerk.

References

External links

 Alfred Chalk profile (olympics.com)
 Upton Park Football Club – players: 1891 to 1911
 Alfred Chalk's profile at Sports Reference.com

1874 births
1954 deaths
English footballers
English Olympic medallists
Olympic gold medallists for Great Britain
Olympic footballers of Great Britain
Footballers at the 1900 Summer Olympics
Upton Park F.C. players
Olympic medalists in football
Medalists at the 1900 Summer Olympics
Association football midfielders
People from Plaistow, Newham